The 2021 Special Honours in New Zealand were three special honours lists, published in New Zealand on 9 August, 28 September, and 21 December 2021.

Appointments were made to the New Zealand Order of Merit and the Queen's Service Order to incoming governor-general, Dame Cindy Kiro, and the outgoing vice-regal consort, Sir David Gascoigne. There was also a redesignation for the writer Vincent O'Sullivan from Distinguished Companion to Knight Companion of New Zealand Order of Merit. O'Sullivan had previously declined redesignation when titular honours were reintroduced by the New Zealand government in 2009.

New Zealand Order of Merit

Dame Grand Companion (GNZM)
Additional
 Dame Alcyion Cynthia Kiro  – Governor-General Designate

Knight Companion (KNZM)
Redesignation
 Emeritus Professor Vincent Gerard O'Sullivan  – of Dunedin. Appointed a Distinguished Companion of the New Zealand Order of Merit on 5 June 2000.

Companion of the Queen's Service Order (QSO)
Additional
 Dame Alcyion Cynthia Kiro  – Governor-General Designate
 Sir David Rendel Gascoigne

References

Special honours
Special honours